The m:tel First League of the Federation of Bosnia and Herzegovina is a football league in Bosnia and Herzegovina. Together with the First League of the Republika Srpska, it forms the second level of football in Bosnia and Herzegovina.

The league consists of 16 teams. Each team plays a total of 30 games during the course of a regular season, twice each team (once at home and once away). The league champion is promoted to the Premier League of Bosnia and Herzegovina. Relegated teams fall to the Second League of the Federation of Bosnia and Herzegovina. The number of relegated clubs depends on how many teams will enter the competition - Four winners of the third level leagues (Second league) and clubs relegated from the Premier League. Depending on the situation, three to five teams can be relegated.

Sponsorship
On 13 August 2020, the Football Association of the Federation of Bosnia and Herzegovina signed a three-year deal with Mtel regarding the sponsorship of the league, effectively renaming the league m:tel First League.

Member clubs for 2022–23

League champions
The list of champions:
1995–96 NK Bosna Visoko (North), FK Radnik Hadžići (South)
1996–97 NK Drina Zvornik-Živince (North), FK Olimpik (South)
1997–98 FK Budućnost Banovići (North), FK Vrbanjuša (Centre), NK Iskra Bugojno (South)
1998–99 FK Krajina Cazin
1999–00 NK Travnik
2000–01 HNK Grude 
2001–02 NK Žepče
2002–03 NK Travnik
2003–04 FK Budućnost Banovići
2004–05 NK Jedinstvo Bihać
2005–06 FK Velež Mostar
2006–07 NK Travnik
2007–08 NK Zvijezda Gradačac
2008–09 FK Olimpik
2009–10 FK Budućnost Banovići
2010–11 NK GOŠK Gabela
2011–12 NK Gradina
2012–13 NK Vitez
2013–14 FK Sloboda Tuzla
2014–15 FK Mladost Doboj Kakanj
2015–16 NK Metalleghe-BSI
2016–17 NK GOŠK Gabela
2017–18 FK Tuzla City
2018–19 FK Velež Mostar
2019–20 FK Olimpik
2020–21 HŠK Posušje
2021–22 FK Igman Konjic

References

External links
 Standings, results & fixtures at Soccerway

 
2
Bos